Happy Birthday, Wanda June is a 1971 American comedy-drama film directed by Mark Robson, based on a 1970 play by Kurt Vonnegut.

Plot
The opening of this play is "This is a simple-minded play about men who enjoy killing, and those who don't."

Big-game hunter and war hero Harold Ryan returns home to America, after having been presumed dead for several years. During the war, he killed over 200 men and women, and countless more animals — for sport. He was in the Amazon Rainforest hunting for diamonds with Colonel Looseleaf Harper, a slow-witted aviation hero, who had the unhappy task of dropping the atomic bomb on Nagasaki.  Harold finds that his wife Penelope has developed relationships with men very much unlike himself, including a vacuum cleaner salesman called Shuttle and a hippie doctor called Dr. Woodly, who later becomes Harold's foe. Harold also finds that his son, Paul, has been pampered and grown unmanly. Harold Ryan, the prolific killing machine, is very unsatisfied. It is set during 1960s America, and Harold feels the country has become weak, all the heroes have been replaced by intolerable pacifists, and that in postwar America, no proper enemy is available for him to vanquish. This is the story of his tragic attempt to find one.

The "Wanda June" of the title is a young girl who died before she could celebrate her birthday. She was run over by an ice cream truck, but she is very pleased with her situation in Heaven, and feels that dying is a good thing and everyone in Heaven loves the person who sent them there. Her birthday cake was subsequently purchased by one of Penelope's lovers, for a celebration of Harold's birthday in his absence. Wanda June and several other deceased connections to Harold Ryan (including his ex-wife Mildred who drank herself to death because she could not stand Harold's premature ejaculation, and Major Siegfried von Konigswald, the Beast of Yugoslavia, Harold Ryan's most infamous victim) speak to the audience from Heaven, where Jesus, Judas Iscariot, Adolf Hitler, and Albert Einstein are happily playing shuffleboard.

Cast

 Rod Steiger as Harold Ryan 
 Susannah York as Penelope Ryan 
 George Grizzard as Dr. Norbert Woodley 
 Don Murray as Herb Shuttle 
 William Hickey as Looseleaf Harper 
 Steven Paul as Paul Ryan 
 Pamelyn Ferdin as Wanda June 
 Pamela Saunders as Mildred Ryan 
 Louis Turenne as Major von Koningswald

Productions and adaptations
Happy Birthday, Wanda June originated as a play titled Penelope, first performed at the Orleans Arena Theater in Orleans, Massachusetts.An interview with Vonnegut about the premier of his play at the Arena Theatre is part of the film about the Arena entitled "Stagestruck: Confessions from Summer Stock Theatre", available on PBS.

Vonnegut and composer Richard Auldon Clark collaborated on an opera adaptation which was debuted at Butler University in 2016, nine years after Vonnegut's death.

The Gene Frankel Theater staged an Off-Off-Broadway revival in April 2018, directed by Jeff Wise and featuring Jason O'Connell, Kate MacCluggage, and Matt Harrington. and a later off-Broadway revival, in November 2018, with the same performers, by the Wheelhouse Theater Company, at The Duke on 42nd Street.

See also
 List of American films of 1971

References

External links

1971 films
American satirical films
American comedy-drama films
Films based on works by Kurt Vonnegut
American films based on plays
Films directed by Mark Robson
1960 plays
Works by Kurt Vonnegut
Columbia Pictures films
1970s English-language films
1970s American films